The 5th Group Communication and Information Systems is a military communications unit in the Land Component of the Belgian Armed Forces.

CIS, 5